Statistics of Danish National Football Tournament in the 1916/1917 season.

Province tournament

First round
Odense Boldklub 3-2 Vejen SF
Boldklubben 1901 1-0 Frederiksborg IF

Second round
Odense Boldklub 2-3 Boldklubben 1901

Copenhagen Championship

Semifinal
Kjøbenhavns Boldklub 4-0 Boldklubben 1901

Final
Kjøbenhavns Boldklub 6-2 Akademisk Boldklub

References
Denmark - List of final tables (RSSSF)

1916–17 in Danish football
Top level Danish football league seasons
Denmark